Cycling, for the 2019 Island Games, held in various locations around Gibraltar in July 2019.

Medal table

Results

Men

Women

References 

2019 Island Games
2019
Island Games